José Acquelin (born April 4, 1956 in Montreal) is a Canadian poet from Quebec. He won the Governor General's Award for French-language poetry at the 2014 Governor General's Awards for Anarchie de la lumière, and was a nominee for the same award at the 1996 Governor General's Awards for L'Oiseau respirable.

Two editions of his poetry have also been translated into English for publication by Guernica Editions.

Works

1987 - Tout va rien
1990 - Le Piéton immobile
1991 - Tarokado
1992 - Chien d'azur
1995 - Cité ouverte
1995 - L'oiseau respirable
1995 - L'éternité est un entretemps
1997 - Autour du temps
1998 - L'Orange vide
1999 - Comme les dix doigts de las manos
1999 - Là où finit la terre
2000 - Premiers mots de l'an 2000
2000 - Jaune Rouge Bleu (with Joël Des Rosiers and Suzanne Jacob)
2003 - L'inconscient du soleil
2004 - L'épluche-œil
2005 - Mexiquatrains
2006 - Personne ne sait que je t'aime
2006 - L'absolu est un dé rond
2007 - Il n'est sens que d'apprendre à mourir
2008 - Paradoxes de la fragilité - en marge du poème
2008 - Fantounel, slam de mon enfance en pays occitan
2008 - La plaquette cubaine (with Bertrand Laverdure and Yannick Renaud)
2009 - Dans l'oeil de la luciole
2009 - L'infini est moins triste que l'éternité
2010 - Jonquilles des palanges
2010 - Château bizarre : Rien-sur-Mer
2011 - Nous sommes tous des sauvages
2011 - Le temps a parfois de ces tendresses
2011 - Le zéro est l'origine de l'au-delà
2012 - Comme si tu avais encore le temps de rêver = Com si encara tinguessis temps de somiar
2014 - Anarchie de la lumière

Translations
2010 - The Man Who Delivers Clouds (selected poetry translated by Antonio D'Alfonso)
2014 - The Absolute Is a Round Die (translation of L'absolu est un dé rond by Hugh Hazelton)

See also

Canadian literature
Canadian poetry
List of Canadian poets
List of Canadian writers
List of Quebec writers

References

1956 births
Living people
Canadian poets in French
20th-century Canadian poets
20th-century Canadian male writers
Canadian male poets
21st-century Canadian poets
Governor General's Award-winning poets
Writers from Montreal
21st-century Canadian male writers
University of Toulouse-Jean Jaurès alumni
Université de Montréal alumni